Erich Johann Albert Raeder (24 April 1876 – 6 November 1960) was a German admiral who played a major role in the naval history of World War II. Raeder attained the highest possible naval rank, that of grand admiral, in 1939, becoming the first person to hold that rank since Henning von Holtzendorff in 1918. Raeder led the Kriegsmarine for the first half of the war; he resigned in January 1943 and was replaced by Karl Dönitz. At the Nuremberg Trials he was sentenced to life imprisonment but was released early owing to failing health.

Early career

Early years
Raeder was born in Wandsbek in the Prussian province of Schleswig-Holstein in the German Empire. His father was a headmaster, who as a teacher and a father was noted for his marked authoritarian views, and who impressed upon his son the values of hard work, thrift, faith and obedience – all values that Raeder preached throughout his life. Hans Raeder also warned his children that if Germany were to become a democracy, that would be a disaster as it meant government by men "playing politics" – doing what was only best for their petty sectarian interests instead of the nation.

Imperial German Navy

Raeder joined the Kaiserliche Marine (Imperial Navy) in 1894 and rapidly rose in rank, becoming chief of staff for Franz von Hipper in 1912. Raeder's rise up the ranks was due mostly to his intelligence and hard work though from 1901 to 1903 Raeder served on the staff of Prince Heinrich of Prussia, and gained a powerful patron in the process. Owing to his cold and distant personality, Raeder was a man whom even his friends often admitted to knowing very little about. The dominating figure of the Navy was Admiral Alfred von Tirpitz, the autocratic State Secretary of the Navy. Tirpitz's preferred means of obtaining "world power status" was through his Risikotheorie (risk theory) where Germany would build a Risikoflotte (Risk Fleet) that would make it too dangerous for Britain to risk a war with Germany, and thereby alter the international balance of power decisively in the Reich favor. Tirpitz transformed the Navy from the small coastal defense force of 1897 into the mighty High Seas Fleet of 1914.

In 1904, Raeder, who spoke fluent Russian, was sent to the Far East as an observer of the Russo-Japanese War. Starting in 1905, Raeder worked in the public relations section of the Navy, where he first met Tirpitz and began his introduction to politics by briefing journalists to run articles promoting the Seemachtideologie and meeting politicians who held seats in the Reichstag in order to convert them to the Seemachtideologie. Working closely with Tirpitz, Raeder was heavily involved in the lobbying the Reichstag to pass the Third Navy Law of 1906 which committed Germany to building "all big gun battleships" to compete with the new British  in the Anglo-German naval race that had only begun at the start of the 20th century.

Raeder was the captain of Kaiser Wilhelm II's private yacht in the years leading up to World War I. In itself, this was not a rewarding post, but often people in this post were quickly promoted afterwards.

World War I
Raeder served as Hipper's chief of staff during World War I, as well as in combat posts. He took part in the Battle of Dogger Bank in 1915 and in the Battle of Jutland in 1916. Raeder later described Hipper as an admiral who "hated paperwork"; accordingly, Hipper delegated considerable power to Raeder, who thus enjoyed more influence than his position as chief of staff would suggest.

During and after World War I the German navy was divided into two schools of thought. One, led by Admiral Alfred von Tirpitz (1849–1930), consisted of avid followers of the teachings of the American historian Alfred Thayer Mahan (1840–1914) and believed in building a "balanced fleet" centered around the battleship that would seek out and win a decisive battle of annihilation (Entscheidungsschlacht) against the Royal Navy in the event of war. The other school, led by Commander Wolfgang Wegener (1875–1956), argued that because of superior British shipbuilding capacity Germany could never hope to build a "balanced fleet" capable of winning an Entscheidungsschlacht, and so the best use of German naval strength was to build a fleet of cruisers and submarines that would wage a guerre de course (commerce raiding against an enemy's merchant shipping). After reading all three of Wegener's papers setting out his ideas, Admiral Hipper decided to submit them to the Admiralty in Berlin, but changed his mind after reading a paper by Raeder attacking the Wegener thesis as flawed. This marked the beginning of a long feud between Raeder and Wegener, with Wegener claiming that his former friend Raeder was jealous of what Wegener insisted were his superior ideas.

In May 1916 Raeder played a major role planning a raid by Hipper's battlecruisers that aimed to lure out the British battlecruiser force which would then be destroyed by the main High Seas Fleet. This raid turned into the Battle of Jutland.

As chief of staff to Admiral Hipper he was closely involved in a plan of Hipper's for a German battlecruiser squadron to sail across the Atlantic and sweep through the waters off Canada down to the West Indies and on to South America to sink the British cruisers operating in those waters, and thereby force the British to redeploy a substantial part of the Home Fleet to the New World. Though Hipper's plans were rejected as far too risky, they significantly influenced Raeder's later thinking.

On 14 October 1918, Raeder received a major promotion with appointment as deputy to Admiral Paul Behncke, the Naval State Secretary. Raeder had doubts about submarines, but he spent the last weeks of the war working to achieve the Scheer Programme of building 450 U-boats.

On 28 October 1918 the Imperial German fleet mutinied. Raeder played a major role in attempting to crush the mutiny.

Weimar Republic
Raeder's two younger brothers were both killed in action in the First World War, and in 1919 his first marriage, which had been under heavy strain due to war-related stress, ended in divorce. For the puritanical Raeder, the divorce was a huge personal disgrace, and for the rest of his life he always denied his first marriage. The years 1918–1919 were some of the most troubled in his life.

High Seas Fleet mutiny
In the winter of 1918–19, Raeder was closely involved in the efforts of the naval officer corps, strongly backed by the Defense Minister Gustav Noske to disband the sailors' councils established after the mutiny. Noske was a Majority Social Democrat with firm "law and order" views. During this period, Raeder served as the liaison between the naval officer corps and Noske, and it was Raeder who suggested to Noske on 11 January 1919 that Adolf von Trotha be appointed commander-in-chief of the Navy. Tirpitz's attacks on the Emperor's leadership during the war had caused a split in the officer corps between the followers of "the Master" and the Kaiser, and Raeder saw Trotha as the only officer acceptable to both factions. Noske in turn asked the Navy for volunteers for the Freikorps to crush uprisings from the Communists. The Navy contributed two brigades to the Freikorps. The price to the Navy for supporting the Freikorps was the continuation of the Navy's "state-within-the state" status, and the end of attempts to democratize the military. Under the Weimar Republic, the military considered itself überparteiliche (above party), which did not mean political neutrality as implied. The military argued that there were two types of "politics": parteipolitisch (party politics) which was the responsibility of the politicians, and staatspolitisch (state politics) which was the responsibility of the military. Staatspolitisch concerned Germany's "eternal" interests and the "historic mission" of winning world power, which was to be pursued regardless of what the politicians or the people wanted.

Kapp putsch
After the war, in 1920, Raeder was involved in the failed Kapp Putsch when, together with almost the entire naval officer corps, he declared himself openly for the "government" of Wolfgang Kapp against the leaders of the Weimar Republic. In the summer of 1920 Raeder married his second wife, with whom he was to have one son.

After the failure of the Kapp Putsch he was marginalized in the Navy, being transferred to the Naval Archives, where for two years he played a leading role in writing the official history of the Navy in World War I. After this, Raeder resumed his steady rise in the navy hierarchy, becoming Vizeadmiral (vice admiral) in 1925.

Commander-in-chief

On 1 October 1928, Raeder was promoted to admiral and made chief of the Naval Command (Chef der Marineleitung) of the Reichsmarine, the Weimar Republic Navy. On 1 June 1935, the Reichsmarine was renamed the Kriegsmarine and Raeder became its commander-in-chief with the title of Oberbefehlshaber der Kriegsmarine. On 20 April 1936, Raeder was promoted to the new rank of Generaladmiral and granted the rank and authority of a Reichsminister but without the formal title. On 30 January 1937, Hitler conferred the Golden Party Badge on Raeder, thereby enrolling him in the Party (membership number 3,805,228).

World War II

Raeder believed the navy was unprepared for the start of World War II by at least five years. The surface fleet was inadequate to fight the Royal Navy and instead adopted a strategy of convoy raiding. Raeder wanted the Kriegsmarine to play an active part because he feared the budget would be cut after the war. The smaller ships were dispersed around the world in order to force the Royal Navy to disperse their ships to combat them, while the battleships would carry out raids in the North Sea, with a view towards gradually reducing the Royal Navy's strength at home.

Raeder was unhappy with the outcome of the Battle of the River Plate and believed that Hans Langsdorff should not have scuttled the ship, but instead sailed out to engage the Royal Navy. Fleet commander Hermann Boehm was held responsible and was sacked by Raeder, who also issued orders that ships were to fight until the last shell and either win or sink with their flags flying.

The Allies were using Norwegian airfields to transfer aircraft to the Finns fighting against the Soviets in the Winter War, as well as mining Norwegian waters, and the Germans were alarmed by these developments.  If the Allies were to use Norwegian naval bases or successfully mine Norwegian waters, they could cut off Germany's vital iron ore imports from Sweden and tighten the blockade of Germany. The Allies had made plans to invade Norway and Sweden in order to cut off those iron ore shipments. Admiral Rolf Carls, commander of the Kriegsmarine in the Baltic Sea region, proposed the invasion of Norway to Raeder in September 1939. Raeder briefed Hitler on the idea in October, but planning did not begin until December 1939.  The operation was in low-priority planning until the Altmark incident in February 1940, during which a German tanker carrying 300 Allied prisoners in then-neutral Norwegian waters was boarded by sailors from a Royal Navy destroyer and the prisoners were freed. After this, plans for the Norwegian invasion took on a new sense of urgency. The invasion proved costly for the Kriegsmarine, which lost a heavy cruiser, two of its six light cruisers, 10 of its 20 destroyers and six U-boats.  In addition, almost all of the other capital ships were damaged and required dockyard repairs, and for a time the German surface fleet had only three light cruisers and four destroyers operational in the aftermath of the Norwegian campaign.

The swift victory over France allowed the Kriegsmarine to base itself in ports on France's west coast. This was strategically important as German warships would no longer have to navigate through the dangerous English Channel in order to return to friendly ports, as well as allow them to range farther out into the Atlantic to attack convoys. With the surrender of France, Raeder saw the opportunity to greatly enhance the navy's power by confiscating the ships of the French Navy and manning them with his crews.  Hitler however, vetoed this idea, afraid that doing so would push the French navy to join the Royal Navy.  British fears of Raeder's plan resulted in the Attack on Mers-el-Kébir, in which the Royal Navy attacked the French navy despite being at peace with France.

On 11 July 1940, Hitler and Raeder agreed to continue building the battleships called for by Plan Z. Raeder also had bases built at Trondheim on the Norwegian Sea and at Saint-Nazaire and Lorient on the Bay of Biscay. At this time, Raeder and other senior officers began submitting memos to invade (among others) Shetland, Iceland, the Azores, Iran, Madagascar, Kuwait, Egypt and the Dutch East Indies.

On 18 March, Raeder wanted to start firing on US warships even if unprovoked. He declined to invade the Azores because of the surface ship losses the previous year.

In April 1941, Raeder planned to follow up the success of Scharnhorst and Gneisenaus commerce-raiding mission with an even larger mission involving a battleship, two battlecruisers and a heavy cruiser under the command of Lütjens, codenamed Operation Rheinübung. The original plan was to have the battlecruisers Scharnhorst and Gneisenau involved in the operation, but Scharnhorst was undergoing heavy repairs to her engines, and Gneisenau had just suffered a damaging torpedo hit days before which put her out of action for six months. The debacle almost saw the end of using capital ships against merchant shipping. Hitler was not pleased and saw the resources used in the construction and operation of the large Bismarck as a poor investment.

In late 1941, Raeder planned the "channel dash" which sent the remaining two battleships in the French ports to Germany, for further operations in Norwegian waters. The plan was to threaten the Lend-Lease convoys to the Soviet Union, to deter an invasion of Norway, and to tie down elements of the Home Fleet that might otherwise have been used in the Atlantic against the U-boat wolfpacks.

After the attack on Pearl Harbor Raeder, along with Field Marshal Keitel and Reichsmarschall Göring, urged Hitler to immediately declare war on the United States in view of the US war plan Rainbow Five, and to begin the U-boat attacks off the US east coast, which would be called the "Second Happy Time" by German submariners.

Resignation

On 30 January 1943, following Hitler's outrage over the Battle of the Barents Sea, Karl Dönitz, the supreme commander of the Kriegsmarine's U-boat arm, was promoted to grand admiral, and Raeder was named admiral inspector, a ceremonial office. Raeder had failed to inform Hitler of the battle, which Hitler learned about from the foreign press. Hitler thought the Lützow and  lacked fighting spirit, according to Albert Speer. The reorganisation fitted Speer's goal of working more closely with Dönitz.

After the war

Nuremberg trial
Raeder was captured by Soviet troops on 23 June 1945 and imprisoned in Moscow. At the end of July he was taken to Nuremberg to stand trial on the counts of: (1) conspiracy to commit crimes against peace, war crimes, and crimes against humanity; (2) planning, initiating, and waging wars of aggression; and (3) crimes against the laws of war.

Raeder was found guilty on all counts and sentenced to life imprisonment. He was surprised as he had expected to be sentenced to death. His wife, supported by German veterans, led several campaigns to free him until, on account of his ill health, he was released on 26 September 1955.

Freedom
Raeder wrote his autobiography, Mein Leben, using a ghostwriter.

He died in Kiel on 6 November 1960. His wife had died in 1959. He is buried in the Nordfriedhof (North Cemetery), Kiel.

Service summary
Dates of rank
 Seekadett (Sea cadet): 26 Apr 1894
 Fähnrich zur See (Midshipman): 13 May 1895
 Leutnant zur See (Sub-lieutenant): 25 Oct 1897
 Oberleutnant zur See (Lieutenant): c. 1900
 Kapitänleutnant (Lieutenant-commander): c. 1905
 Korvettenkapitän (Commander): 15 Apr 1911
 Fregattenkapitän (Senior commander): c. 1915
 Kapitän zur See (Captain): 19 Nov 1919
 Konteradmiral (Rear admiral): 1 Aug 1922
 Vizeadmiral (Vice admiral): 1 Apr 1925
 Admiral (Admiral): 1 Oct 1928
 Generaladmiral (General admiral): 10 Apr 1936
 Grossadmiral (Grand admiral): 1 Apr 1939

Awards and decorations
 Order of the Double Dragon, 3rd class, 2nd Level (China, 10 October 1898)
 China Medal (German Empire, 12 December 1901)
 Order of the Red Eagle, 4th class (Prussia, 22 June 1907)
 Honorary Knight 2nd class of the House and Merit Order of Peter Frederick Louis with Silver Crown (Oldenburg, 17 September 1907)
 Order of the Red Eagle, 4th class with Crown (Prussia, 5 September 1911)
 Commander's Cross of the Order of Franz Joseph (Austria, 16 September 1911)
 Commander's Cross of the Order of the Redeemer (Greece, 14 May 1912)
 Order of Saint Stanislaus, 2nd class (Russia, 16 April 1913)
 Iron Cross (1914) 2nd Class (19 November 1914) & 1st Class (18 February 1915)
 Imtiyaz Medal in silver with Swords
 Ottoman War Medal (also known as the "Gallipoli Star" or "Iron Crescent")
 Friedrich August Cross, 1st and 2nd class (Oldenburg)
 Knight's Cross of the Royal House Order of Hohenzollern with swords (5 June 1916)
 Military Merit Order, 4th class with swords and crown (Bavaria, 20 December 1916)
 War Commemorative Medal (Bulgaria, 20 November 1917)
 Military Merit Cross, 3rd class with war decoration (Austria-Hungary, 4 September 1918)
 Honorary doctorate from the Faculty of Philosophy, University of Kiel (31 May 1926)
 Grand Cross of the Order of Naval Merit (Spain, 16 November 1928)
 Commander's Cross with Star of the Order of Merit (Chile, September 1928)
 World War Commemorative Medal with swords on (Hungary, 3 June 1931)
 Grand Officer of the Order of Saints Maurice and Lazarus (Italy, 7 May 1934)
 Grand Cross of the Order of Military Merit (Bulgaria, 28 June 1934)
 Cross of Honour (9 October 1934)
 Order of Merit, 1st class (Hungary, 5 December 1934)
 Grand Cross of the Order of the White Rose of Finland (27 February 1936)
 Wehrmacht Long Service Award, 1st class (2 October 1936)
 Olympic Games Decoration, 1st class (16 August 1936)
 Golden Party Badge (30 January 1937)
 Grand Cross of the Order of Saints Maurice and Lazarus (Italy, 20 September 1937)
 Order of the Rising Sun, 1st class (Japan, 9 November 1937)
 War Memorial Medal (Bulgaria, 30 November 1937)
 Golden Medal of Honour of Hamburg (1 April 1939)
 Grand Cross of the Order of Naval Merit in White (Spain, 21 August 1939)
 Sudetenland Medal (25 October 1938) with "Prague Castle" clasp (Sudetenspange) (19 September 1939)
 Memel Medal (26 October 1939)
 Clasp to the Iron Cross, 1st and 2nd class (30 September 1939)
 Knight's Cross of the Iron Cross (nr.1) (30 September 1939) as Großadmiral and Oberbefehlshaber der Kriegsmarine Commander Grand Cross of the Order of the Sword (Sweden, 18 October 1940)
 Grand Cross of the Order of the Sword (Sweden, 24 October 1940)
 Grand Cross of the Military Order of Savoy (4 April 1942)
 Grand Cross Order of the Crown of King Zvonimir with swords and other decorations (Croatia, 26 September 1942)
 Grand Cross of the Order of Merit of the Kingdom of Hungary with war ribbon with swords (Hungary, 8 February 1943)
 Grand Cross of Order of St Alexander with swords (Bulgaria, 3 September 1941)
 Order of Michael the Brave, 1st, 2nd and 3rd Class (Romania, 14 October 1941)
 Grand Cross of the Order of the Cross of Liberty (Finland, 25 March 1942)

References

Citations

Bibliography

 Alexander, Bevin,  How Hitler Could Have Won World War II, New York: Three Rivers Press. 2000. .
 Bergen, Doris, "'Germany Is Our Mission: Christ Is Our Strength!' The Wehrmacht Chaplaincy and the 'German Christian' Movement" pp. 522–536 from Church History Volume 66, Issue # 3, September 1997.
 Bird, Eugene, The Loneliest Man in the World, Rudolph Hess, in Spandau, London: Sphere, 1976.
 Bird, Keith, Weimar, The German Naval Officer Corps and the Rise of National Socialism, Amsterdam: Grüner, 1977, .
 Bird, Keith, Erich Raeder Admiral of the Third Reich, Annapolis: Naval Institute Press, 2006, 
 Buchanan, Patrick, Churchill, Hitler and the Unnecessary War: How Britain Lost Its Empire and the West Lost the World, New York: Random House, 2008, .
 Dörr, Manfred (in German). Die Ritterkreuzträger der Überwasserstreitkräfte der Kriegsmarine – Band 2:L–Z. Osnabrück, Germany: Biblio Verlag. 1996. .
 Fischer, Kurt (in German). Großadmiral Dr. phil. h.c. Erich Raeder. In: Gerd R. Ueberschär (ed.): Hitlers militärische Elite Band 1: Von der Anfängen des Regimes bis zum Kriegsbeginn (pp. 185–194). Darmstadt, Germany: Wissenschaftliche Buchgesellschaft. 1998. .
 Gilbey, Joseph,  Kriegsmarine: Admiral Raeder's Navy – A Broken Dream, 2006.
 Goda, Norman: Tomorrow the World: Hitler, Northwest Africa, and the Path Toward America, Texas A&M University, 1998, .
 Goda, Norman: "Black Marks Hitler's Bribery of his Senior Officers During World War II" pp. 96–137 from Corrupt Histories edited by Emmanuel Kreike and William Jordan, University of Rochester Press, 2005, .
 Goda, Norman, Tales from Spandau: Nazi Criminals and the Cold War, Cambridge, Cambridge University Press, 2007, .
 Hankey, Maurice Politics, Trials and Errors, Clark, New Jersey: Lawbook Exchange, 2002, .
 Hansen, Kenneth "Raeder versus Wegener Conflict in German Strategy" pp. 81–108 from U.S. Naval War College Review, Volume 58, Issue # 4, Autumn 2005.
 Herwig, Holger, "The Failure of German Sea Power, 1914–1945: Mahan, Tirpitz, and Raeder Reconsidered" pp. 68–105 from The International History Review, Volume 10, Issue #1, February 1988.
 Kallis, Aristotle, Fascist Ideology Territory and Expansionism in Italy and Germany 1922–1945, Routledge: London, 2000 .
 Kershaw, Ian, Fateful Choices Ten Decisions that Changed the World 1940–1941, Penguin: London, 2007, .
 Mulligan, Timothy P. "Ship-of-the-Line or Atlantic Raider? Battleship Bismarck Between Design Limitations and Naval Strategy" pp. 1013–1044 from The Journal of Military History, Volume 69, Issue # 4, October 2005.
 Murray, Williamson & Millet, Alan, A War to Be Won Fighting the Second World War, Cambridge: Belknap Press, 2000, .
 Padfield, Peter, Dönitz: the Last Führer, London: Victor Gollancz, 1984, .
 Rahn, Werner, "The War at Sea in the Atlantic and in the Arctic Ocean" pp. 301–441 from Germany and the Second World War Volume VI The Global War Widening of the Conflict into a World War and the Shift of the Initiative 1941–1943 edited by Günther Roth, Oxford: Clarendon Press, 2001 .
 Raeder, Erich, My Life, Annapolis: Naval Institute Press, 1960.
 
 Shirer, William, The Rise and Fall of the Third Reich, New York: Simon & Schuster, 1960, .
 Thomas, Charle,s The German Navy in the Nazi Era, Annapolis: Naval Institute Press, 1990, .
 Wette, Wolfram The Wehrmacht: History, Myth, Reality, Cambridge: Harvard University Press, 2006, .
 Weinberg, Gerhard, The Foreign Policy of Hitler's Germany Diplomatic Revolution in Europe, Chicago: University of Chicago Press, 1970, .
 Weinberg, Gerhard, A World at Arms: A Global History of World War II, Cambridge: Cambridge University Press, 2005, .
 Wheeler-Bennett, John, The Nemesis of Power: The German Army in Politics 1918–1945'', London: Macmillan, 1967, .

External links
 Raeder versus Wegener Conflicts in German Naval Strategy by Commander Kenneth Hansen
 
 
 Raeder, Erich Johann Albert at World War II Graves (includes the plot number)

 
1876 births
1960 deaths
Naval history of World War II
People from Wandsbek
Admirals of the Reichsmarine
Grand admirals of the Kriegsmarine
German people convicted of the international crime of aggression
German prisoners sentenced to life imprisonment
German Protestants
People convicted by the International Military Tribunal in Nuremberg
Prisoners sentenced to life imprisonment by international courts and tribunals
Commanders of the Order of Franz Joseph
Recipients of the Knight's Cross of the Iron Cross
Recipients of the Silver Imtiyaz Medal
Grand Crosses of Naval Merit
Grand Crosses of the Order of Military Merit (Bulgaria)
Grand Crosses of the Order of the Cross of Liberty
Grand Cordons of the Order of the Rising Sun
Knights Grand Cross of the Order of Saints Maurice and Lazarus
Grand Crosses of the Order of Merit of the Republic of Hungary (military)
Commanders Grand Cross of the Order of the Sword
Recipients of the Order of Michael the Brave, 1st class
Knights Grand Cross of the Military Order of Savoy
Recipients of the Order of the Crown of King Zvonimir
Imperial German Navy personnel of World War I
People from the Province of Schleswig-Holstein
Recipients of the clasp to the Iron Cross, 1st class
Military personnel from Hamburg